The Pine Grove Community Club is a historic community club located at the junction of 1500N and 1300E north-northwest of Paris, Illinois. The club includes two buildings, a brick schoolhouse and a former church. The school was constructed in the late 1800s, while the church was built in 1891. The club itself was established in the early 1930s as part of a community development program in Edgar County. The program, inspired by the Country Life Movement, sought to develop rural communities such as Pine Grove and improve the quality of life of its residents. While the club initially met in the schoolhouse, it purchased the church for its meetings in 1935 after the congregation folded. The club had 40 members in 1935; the number declined to below 30 by the 1960s, though the club still met as of 1983.

The club buildings were added to the National Register of Historic Places on March 30, 1984.

Notes

Buildings and structures in Edgar County, Illinois
National Register of Historic Places in Edgar County, Illinois
Clubhouses on the National Register of Historic Places in Illinois